KLKO (93.7 FM, "93.7 Jack FM") is a radio station licensed to serve Elko, Nevada.  The station is owned by Elko Broadcasting Company.  It airs an adult hits music format.

The station was assigned the KLKO call letters by the Federal Communications Commission on December 14, 1981.

References

External links
KLKO official website

LKO
Adult hits radio stations in the United States
Jack FM stations
Radio stations established in 1981
Elko, Nevada